Donald Maclennan Arklay Steel (born 23 August 1937 in Hillingdon, Middlesex) is a former golfer and is a noted golf course designer, as well as being a writer and journalist.  Educated at Fettes College and Christ's College, Cambridge, he has designed a large number of golf courses or modifications to existing courses, mostly in the United Kingdom and Ireland.  Several late 20th century and early 21st century golf course architects worked under Steel in their early careers, among them Martin Ebert, Jonathan Gaunt, Tom Mackenzie.

Steel has also written a number of books about golf. He was golf correspondent for the Sunday Telegraph from its launch in 1961 until 1989, and has written for Country Life since 1983. In 1957, he played cricket for Buckinghamshire in the Minor Counties Championship, making six appearances.

Golf courses (new)
 Abaco Club
 Amarilla
 Aquidneck Club
 Barseback (Pine)
 Bom Sucesso
 Boothferry Golf Club
 Bovey Castle
 Bradfield
 Carnegie Course at Skibo Castle
 Charterhouse
 Harrow School 
 Radley
St. Andrews (Strathtyrum), 
Victoria Golf and Country Resort, Digana, Sri Lanka 
Wellington

Golf courses (renovations)
 Royal St. George's
 St. Andrews (Eden), 1989 
 St. Andrews (Jubilee), 
 The Machrie

References

External links
Donald Steel

1937 births
Living people
People from Hillingdon
People educated at Fettes College
Alumni of Christ's College, Cambridge
English male golfers
Golf course architects
English cricketers
Buckinghamshire cricketers
English writers
English male journalists